Jean-Charles Le Vasseur (21 October 1734, Abbeville - 29 November 1816, Paris) was a French engraver and printmaker.

Biography 
He was the descendent of an old family from Ponthieu. While still very young, he went to Paris to pursue a career in the arts. At the age of nineteen, he studied engraving with Jacques Firmin Beauvarlet and  Jean Daullé, successively. He assiduously sought to vary his style according to the  styles of the painters who entrusted their works to him for reproduction.

In 1770, he engraved a portrait of Marie-Antoinette, shortly after her marriage to the Dauphin (later, Louis XVI). It was based on paintings by Joseph Kranzinger and Joseph Ducreux. The following year, he was formally received at the Académie royale for "Diane et Endymion", after a work by Charles André van Loo. During this period, he began producing illustrations for a large number of books. He also took students on a regular basis, many of whom became well known.

Although his sources were eclectic, he did show a marked preference for certain painters, such as Jean-Baptiste Greuze, who became a good friend. His portrait of Le Vasseur made him known in a genre for which, up to that time, he had received little attention.

He was a Dean at the Académie, and never aspired to a higher position. He avoided becoming involved in any intrigues, but was always prepared to provide a safe haven for church officials during the Revolution; an activity that cost him much of his considerable fortune. 

Despite this, he continued to work, waiting for the unrest to end so he could present his creations to the public. In 1814, when Louis XVIII became King, he dedicated a large scene of the Holy Family to Cardinal Talleyrand.

A few are in the Netherlands, Sweden, and the United States; at the National Gallery of Art and the De Young Museum in San Francisco.

Selected works

References

Further reading 
 Emile Delignières, Catalogue raisonné de l'œuvre gravé de Jean-Charles Le Vasseur, 1866, reprinted by Wentworth Press, 2019 
 Roger Portalis and Henri Béraldi, Les graveurs du dix-huitième siècle, 1880-1882, reprinted by Burt-Franklin, 1970
 Jacques Lethève and Françoise Gardey, BnF Estampes, Inventaire du fonds français après 1800, 1967, Vol.XIV, Lepan-Lys, p. 226 (Online)

External links 

Entry for Le Vasseur @ the British Museum

1734 births
1816 deaths
French engravers
French printmakers
People from Abbeville